The Bull at Pinehurst Farms, often called simply just The Bull, is a Jack Nicklaus-designed golf course located in Sheboygan Falls, Wisconsin. It is the only golf course in the state of Wisconsin designed by Jack Nicklaus. As of 2021, The Bull was ranked the 91st best public course in the United States, The golf course has 18 holes and was built on the former Pinehurst dairy farm.

Hole by Hole Tour

The first four holes at The Bull are relatively tame, but don't be fooled.  This is a Jack Nicklaus design.

The first hole (named Copyright) plays 408 yards from the back tees.  This straightaway par 4 is meant to ease you into your round.

The second hole (named Blueprint) is a dogleg right par 4 measuring 411 yards, and wraps around a pond to the right side of the fairway.  The green is surrounded by a total of 5 bunkers, making for an accurate approach shot.

The third hole (Peerless) is a 217-yard par 3, similar in design to hole 5 at Pebble Beach (the 5th hole at Pebble Beach was also designed by Nicklaus).  The same pond playing down the right side, the narrow green is also surrounded by challenging bunkers.

The fourth hole (Caravan) is a short par 5, measuring only 548 yards.  Being able to carry your drive over the collection of bunkers to the left of the landing area will give players a legitimate chance at reaching the green in two.  However, the smallest green at The Bull is surrounded by bunkers.

The fifth hole (Follow On) is one of the best holes in the entire state of Wisconsin.  Playing at 432 yards from the back tees, this dogleg left par 4 is protected by a 40 foot deep ravine up the entire left side of the hole.  Also, trees protect the right side of the fairway, demanding a very accurate tee shot and approach.  This hole may very well be the signature hole at The Bull.

The sixth hole (Elation) is a downhill par 3 playing to 193 yards, with trees surrounding the hole on all sides.

The seventh hole (Starz) is the shortest par 4 on the course, measuring to just 321 yards from the back tees.  Beginning at an elevated tee and ending at an elevated green, many players may take a crack at the green off of the tee, though the safer play is to hit a layup down the middle of the fairway and then a wedge onto the large green.

The eighth hole (Avant Garde) is a 568-yard par 5.  After the tee shot over the Onion River, players have two choices.  They can either play down the narrow right fairway and get to the green in two, or play down the wider left fairway and layup, and then hit a wedge into the green.  Either way, the player will again have to cross the river before reaching the green.

The ninth hole (Dynasty) is an uphill par 4 back to the clubhouse measuring 453 yards.  Usually playing into the wind, the approach shot can be very difficult.

The front nine plays to 3551 yards from the back tees.

The tenth hole (Renaissance) is a downhill par 4 playing to 469 yards.  This dogleg right's green is protected by bunkers on both sides, as well as a pond to the right.

The eleventh hole (Medallian) is another short par 4, this being 357 yards.  Players have three options off of the tee: drive the green, play it safe down the left fairway, or take a riskier shot down the right fairway in order to set up a much shorter and easier approach.  The first and third options bring a pond into play, both requiring a long carry over it.

The twelfth hole (Primetime) is a long, downhill par 3.  This 232-yard hole plays to a green surrounded by numerous bunkers.

The thirteenth hole (Escapade) is the longest hole on the course, measuring 581 yards.  This par 5 has 12 bunkers, the most of any hole at The Bull.  The difficult approach shot is to a large, elevated green.

The fourteenth hole (Cornerstone) is a long, difficult par 4 that measures 475 yards from the back tees.  This dogleg right is guarded on the entire right side by the Onion River.  The approach shot to the small green is also slightly uphill.

The fifteenth hole (Landmark) is the shortest hole on the course, playing to 182 yards from the back tees.  With a pond guarding the left side of this par 3 and a bunker to the right of the green, the center of the green is the best option off of the tee.

The sixteenth hole (Payday) is an uphill par 4 measuring 425 yards.  The approach shot plays across a deep ravine to a large green.

The seventeenth hole (High Life) is a 572-yard par 5.  The tee shot plays over a ravine.  The second shot layup plays downhill across the Onion River.  The approach plays to an elevated green surrounded by bunkers.

The eighteenth hole at The Bull (Rock-n-Roll) is a long, demanding par 4, measuring to 485 yards from the back tees.  This is one of the best finishing holes in Wisconsin.  The tee shot requires a carry over a pond, and the approach plays to a small green nestled behind wetlands.

The back nine measures 3778 yards from the back tees.

From the back tees, The Bull measures 7329 yards, with a course rating of 76.1 and a slope rating of 143.

Scorecard

Resources

External links 

Golf clubs and courses in Wisconsin
Buildings and structures in Sheboygan County, Wisconsin
Tourist attractions in Sheboygan County, Wisconsin